Lieutenant General James Lowell Campbell (born 16 August 1949) is a retired Lieutenant General in the United States Army and was previously Director of the Army Staff.  He previously commanded the U.S. Army, Pacific from November 2002 to August 2004. Commissioned through ROTC, he graduated in 1971 from the University of Missouri with a Bachelor of Science in Physical Education. He went on to earn a Master of Science from the University of Illinois, also in Physical Education, as well as a Master of Arts in National Security and Strategic Studies from the U.S. Naval War College.

Campbell served in several high-profile operations, including Operation Restore Hope in Somalia in 1993, and in Operation Uphold Democracy in Haiti in 1994. During his time as Commanding General of the 10th Mountain Division from 1999 to 2001, he deployed to Bosnia and Herzegovina and served as Commanding General for the Multi-National Division (North) for Operation Joint Forge.

Other major duty assignments for Campbell include commander of the Joint Task Force for Full Accounting for United States Pacific Command. From 1997 to 1999 he served as Assistant Division Commander for the 25th Infantry Division. Prior to his USARPAC command, he served as Special Assistant to the Commanding General at Fort Shafter.

Awards and decorations

After his tenure at USARPAC, Campbell was assigned to the staff of the Vice Chief of Staff for the U.S. Army in Washington, D.C., where he served as Senior Vice President, Chief of Staff and Operations for Military Professional Resources Inc.

References

1949 births
Living people
University of Missouri alumni
University of Illinois Urbana-Champaign alumni
Naval War College alumni
Recipients of the Distinguished Service Medal (US Army)
Recipients of the Legion of Merit
United States Army generals
Recipients of the Defense Superior Service Medal